Kawno may refer to the following places:
Kawno, Kuyavian-Pomeranian Voivodeship (north-central Poland)
Kawno, Choszczno County in West Pomeranian Voivodeship (north-west Poland)
Kawno, Sławno County in West Pomeranian Voivodeship (north-west Poland)